Florian Bruzzo (born 1 June 1982) is a French water polo coach. He was the head coach of the France men's national water polo team at the 2016 Summer Olympics.

References

External links
 

1982 births
Living people
French male water polo players
French water polo coaches
France men's national water polo team coaches
Water polo coaches at the 2016 Summer Olympics